This Side of Paradise is the second solo studio album released by Ric Ocasek, lead singer and songwriter of the Cars. It was released in 1986 by Geffen Records. Though it was a solo album, other members of the Cars played significant roles. Greg Hawkes plays keyboards and bass throughout the album (he appears on most of Ocasek's solo albums), and also co-wrote "Hello Darkness" (most Cars albums feature one Ocasek/Hawkes tune). Benjamin Orr is on backing vocals for three songs. Along with Hawkes and Orr, the track "True To You" also features Elliot Easton on guitar. Both production and drumming were by Chris Hughes (formerly known as "Merrick", drummer for Adam and the Ants). Hughes was the recent producer of Tears for Fears most popular two albums. Steve Stevens from Billy Idol's band plays guitar on over half of the album.

In addition, Roland Orzabal from Tears for Fears (guitar on "Emotion in Motion"), Tony Levin from King Crimson/Peter Gabriel, Tom Verlaine of Television and G. E. Smith of the Saturday Night Live Band guest on various tracks.

The first single from the album, "Emotion in Motion", which was aided in its promotion by a video that received heavy airplay on MTV, reached number 1 on the Mainstream Rock Tracks for one week, becoming Ocasek's only solo chart-topper (as a member of the Cars, he topped the chart with the singles "You Might Think" and "Magic" in 1984, and "Tonight She Comes" in 1985). Ocasek remains the only member of the Cars to have a number 1 hit single.

Promotion
Guitarist G.E. Smith's involvement with the album proved convenient when Ocasek assembled a backing band (including Greg Hawkes on keyboards) to appear as musical guest on Saturday Night Live, mostly using the Saturday Night Live Band, which then featured Smith as bandleader. Appearing on Episode 3 of Season 12, Ocasek performed "Emotion in Motion" and "Keep on Laughin'". Ric also appeared in a comedy sketch starring Dana Carvey's recurring character the Church Lady, who incorrectly introduced him as Keith Richards. After Ocasek corrected her, she then addressed him as "Ricky". In her typical way, the Church Lady piously criticized the sensuality of his rock and roll music.

Title
This is the second consecutive Ocasek album to derive its title from an indirect poetry reference.  In this case, This Side of Paradise shares its title with 1920 debut novel of F. Scott Fitzgerald, which in turn took its title from a line of the Rupert Brooke poem "Tiare Tahiti".

Song details
The album begins with various sound-effects, including a woman's voice speaking a foreign language, and the musical theme of "Look in Your Eyes", before "Keep on Laughin'" begins.

"Coming for You" features a recurring motif previously heard on "Nightspots" from the Cars' album Candy-O: Under an E minor chord, B-C-B-A-E.

"True Love" features a classical-styled solo on nylon-stringed acoustic guitar, played by Steve Stevens, who was then better known for the bombastic electric style that he brought to Billy Idol's material.

"P.F.J." is a character sketch of a young man called "Pink Flag Joe". It features Greg Hawkes on clarinet and harmonica, as well as keyboards and bass.

The second chorus to "Hello Darkness", beginning with "Hello darkness / You are my friend", could be a reference to the well-known Simon and Garfunkel song "The Sounds of Silence", which begins "Hello darkness, my old friend". Ocasek has long had a habit of using well-known titles and lyrical references, such as the Cars songs "Good Times Roll", "Bye Bye Love", "Think It Over" and "Maybe Baby", among others.

Before the last song, the title track, has quite faded away, it abruptly switches to an instrumental, synthesizer-dominated reprise of "True Love", which gradually fades out to end the album.

Track listing
All tracks composed by Ric Ocasek except as noted.
 "Keep on Laughin'" – 4:36
 "True to You" – 3:59
 "Emotion in Motion" – 4:41
 "Look in Your Eyes" – 6:00
 "Coming for You" – 5:34
 "Mystery" – 4:20
 "True Love" – 4:23
 "P.F.J." – 3:39 
 "Hello Darkness" (Ocasek, Greg Hawkes) – 4:52
 "This Side of Paradise" – 8:04

Personnel
Ric Ocasek – vocals, bass, guitar, keyboards
Steve Stevens – guitar
Tom Verlaine – guitar on "P.F.J."
Sandy McLelland – background vocals
Elliot Easton - guitar
Greg Hawkes – bass, keyboards, background vocals
Chris Hughes – drums
Tony Levin – stick bass
Benjamin Orr – background vocals
Roland Orzabal – guitar, background vocals
G.E. Smith – guitar
Andy Topeka – programming, synclavier, technical maintenance

Technical
Ross Cullum – engineer
Joe Barbaria – mixing
Nick Egan – design
Arthur Eigort – photography

Charts

Notes 

1986 albums
Ric Ocasek albums
Albums produced by Ric Ocasek
Geffen Records albums
Albums produced by Chris Hughes (musician)